The Barrett XM109 is a prototype anti materiel sniper rifle, chambered for 25 × 59 mm grenade rounds and developed by Barrett Firearms Manufacturing.

Prototypes of the XM109 have existed since the late 1990s and studies of the weapon's effectiveness were released in 2002; 10 prototypes were known to exist in 2004, and the XM109 and Barrett XM500 were folded into a broader Anti-Material Rifle Congressional Program in 2006. The current status of the XM109 is not particularly clear, with no news of either cancellation or potential adoption.

Overview
The XM109, originally known as the Objective Sniper Weapon (OSW) and now called the Anti-Materiel Payload Rifle (AMPR), is a semi-automatic anti-materiel rifle, designed primarily for engagement of light armored vehicles and similar targets. The design uses the lower receiver from an M82/M107, but with a new upper receiver chambered in 25mm. The upper receiver of the M82 rifles can be replaced with an XM109 upper receiver to form a fully functional XM109 rifle.

The 25 × 59 mm round that is used in the XM109 is the same one originally developed for the cancelled XM307, product of the Objective (later Advanced) Crew Served Weapon program (OCSW / ACSW). As with the XM307, the XM109 can be reconfigured back to .50 BMG, in the XM109's case this is done by swapping the 25mm upper receiver for a standard M82 / M107 upper.

The XM109 offers greater range and a shorter overall length than the previous M82/M107 systems, as well as potentially greater power in the 25 × 59 mm cartridge over even the Mk 211 .50 BMG cartridge (AKA "Raufoss round"). However, the small amount of propellant and heavy projectile resulted in unacceptably high recoil due to limiting the effects of the weapon's muzzle brake, with a recoil force of over 60 foot-pounds compared to 36 for the M107. As of 2004, one of the project goals was to reduce the weapon's recoil.

Other features
Picatinny rail
BORS ballistic computer
Monopod socket
Dual-chamber detachable muzzle brake or suppressor system
Detachable bipod and carry handle

See also
 Barrett M82
 Barrett XM500
 List of firearms
 List of individual weapons of the U.S. Armed Forces
 Neopup PAW-20
 Norinco LG5 / QLU-11
 XM25 CDTE

References

External links
Official Website of Barrett Firearms Company
An image of the XM109, Popular Mechanics
GlobalSecurity.org - M109 Anti-Materiel Payload Rifle (AMPR)
DTIC Briefing on XM109

Barrett firearms
Rifles of the United States
Semi-automatic rifles
Sniper rifles
Anti-materiel rifles
Grenade launchers of the United States